Gian Giacomo Adria or Adria Johannes Jacobus de Paulo (born in Mazara del Vallo in Sicily  - died in Palermo in 1560) was an Italian physician, historian and humanist.

Biography
He first studied in Mazara del Vallo with the humanist Tommaso Schifaldo, then moved to Palermo, where he studied rhetoric. He then went to Naples where he worked with Agostino Nifo.

On 29th June 1510, he obtained the degree of Doctor of Philosophy and Medicine in Salerno. He began to practise the medical profession in Sicily.

In 1535, he took part in the conquest of Tunis as a physician and was made an Imperial Knight by Charles V. On his return to Rome, he took care of Pope Clement VII. He was appointed Protomedicus of Sicily.

He died at the age of 75 in Palermo where he was buried in the church San Francesco d'Assisi, Palermo, where the following epitaph can be read:

Works

He wrote several works of a historical-scientific, literary and poetic nature.

Scientific works

Literary works
 .

Manuscripts
The following manuscripts are kept in the Municipal Library of Palermo :

References

16th-century Italian physicians
Italian humanists
16th-century Italian historians
1560 deaths